Thunder Among the Leaves is a 1958 Argentine drama film directed by Armando Bó, starring himself, Isabel Sarli, Ernesto Báez and Andrés Laszlo. The screenplay by Paraguayan writer Augusto Roa Bastos was based on his short story . Set in Paraguay, the story is about a strike at a sawmill.

The first film to feature full frontal nudity in Latin American cinema, Thunder Among the Leaves scandalized audiences and became a major box office success on the continent. It rocketed Sarli to stardom and is now considered a cult classic.

Synopsis
The arrival of the boss's young wife unearths laborer tensions accumulated after many years of deprivation and maltreatment. The story is a social drama about the exploitation of man.

Cast

Armando Bó as Julio Guillén
Isabel Sarli as Flavia Forkel
Andrés Laszlo as Max Forkel
Ernesto Báez as Capanga
Félix Ribero
Luis Leguisamón
Eladio Martínez
Leandro S. Cacavelos
Roque Centurión Miranda
Aníbal Romero
Matías Ferreira Díaz
Javier Franco
Alejo Vargas
Nieves Esquivel
Tabú
Adolfo Cuellar
Luis Guastalla
Kika Da Silva
Manuel E. B. Argüello
Guillermo Ketterer
Rafael Rojas Doria
Amador García
César Alvarez Blanco

Production
Sarli's inclusion in the film was inspired by Brigitte Bardot's role in And God Created Woman. Thunder Among the Leaves was filmed with the same camera used in Leopoldo Torres Ríos' Pelota de trapo in 1948 and Leopoldo Torre Nilsson's Días de odio in 1954.

During principal photography, Bó convinced Sarli to get naked in a scene in which she bathed in a lake though he had told her earlier that she would wear a flesh-colored bodystocking. Although Bó told Sarli they would shoot from afar, the camera lens had magnification.

Reception

Critic Gustavo J. Castagna felt that the aesthetic of Thunder Among the Leaves was reminiscent of the social commentary films by Hugo del Carril and Mario Soffici. Critic Sergio Wolf described Bó's films during this time as serial and each followed the generic pattern described by Arnold Hauser: the exaggerated and sharp, the harsh and exotic. Wolf said that Thunder Among the Leaves exhibits this pattern when Julio, who has nothing to lose, lets his passion boil over and rapes Flavia.

The film was a highly controversial box-office success. Argentine newspaper La Nación wrote in 1969 that the film left an extraordinary international mark and was one of Argentina's biggest blockbusters over recent years. In November 1958, The News and Courier reported that "a saucy Latin lass has smashed South American box office records with the most daring dunking since Hedy Lamarr disrobed to fame in Ecstasy." The movie's premiere in Montevideo, Uruguay, broke box office records, and Sarli's bath scene "rocked some Latin American capitals". In April 1959 Brian Bell of the Pittsburgh Post-Gazette wrote, "There was nothing particularly exciting about the movie except Miss Sarli, in a birthday suit swimming scene. It was a box office smash in South America." However, Sarli was panned by fellow filmmakers for the nude scene.

Cultural impact

The film featured Isabel Sarli in her first starring role and made her a sex symbol. It also marked the beginning of her partnership with Armando Bó. The partnership spanned almost three decades and made numerous sexploitation films. Now considered a classic, the bath scene was the first one to feature full frontal nudity in Argentine cinema, and in all of Latin America. The News and Courier wrote "the opening in Buenos Aires was hailed as the start of a new era for Argentina's movie industry" after the end of Juan Perón's service as president and his propaganda techniques. Thunder Among the Leaves was the star vehicle for Sarli and made her and Bó internationally renowned. The nude scene, particularly, is said to have "[sparked] her star phenomena". The scandal caused by it attracted the international press and Sarli soon appeared in publications such as Time and Life. The film made her popular and at the premiere of her second film with Bó, Sabaleros (1959), a crowd of young fans mobbed her as she got to the cinema, ripped her dress and broke through a police cordon, which caused Sarli to faint twice. The Star-Banner reported "Buenos Aires moviegoers could not remember a more surprising and delirious reception for an Argentine movie actress."

See also

1958 in film
List of Argentine films of 1958
Nudity in film

References

External links

1958 films
Argentine drama films
Argentine black-and-white films
Films about rape
Films directed by Armando Bó
Films shot in Paraguay
Nudity and protest
1950s Spanish-language films
Guaraní-language films